Kakitos Mountain is located in the Lewis Range, Glacier National Park in the U.S. state of Montana. Kakitos is the Blackfoot word for "star".

See also
 Mountains and mountain ranges of Glacier National Park (U.S.)

References

Mountains of Glacier County, Montana
Mountains of Glacier National Park (U.S.)
Lewis Range